Newton John Randall (February 3, 1880 – May 3, 1955) was an outfielder in Major League Baseball. He played for the Chicago Cubs and Boston Doves in 1907.

External links

1880 births
1955 deaths
Major League Baseball outfielders
Baseball people from Ontario
Boston Doves players
Canadian expatriate baseball players in the United States
Cavalier (minor league baseball) players
Chicago Cubs players
Winnipeg Maroons (baseball) players
Duluth White Sox players
Denver Grizzlies (baseball) players
Milwaukee Brewers (minor league) players
Oakland Oaks (baseball) players
Bismarck Capitals players
Major League Baseball players from Canada
People from Clearview, Ontario